Friedrich Engel (26 December 1861 – 29 September 1941) was a German mathematician.

Engel was born in Lugau, Saxony, as the son of a Lutheran pastor. He attended the Universities of both Leipzig and Berlin, before receiving his doctorate from Leipzig in 1883.

Engel studied under Felix Klein at Leipzig, and collaborated with Sophus Lie for much of his life. He worked at Leipzig (1885–1904), Greifswald (1904–1913), and Giessen (1913–1931). He died in Giessen.

Engel was the co-author, with Sophus Lie, of the three volume work Theorie der Transformationsgruppen (publ. 1888–1893; tr., "Theory of transformation groups"). Engel was the editor of the collected works of Sophus Lie with six volumes published between 1922 and 1937; the seventh and final volume was prepared for publication but appeared almost twenty years after Engel's death. He was also the editor of the collected works of Hermann Grassmann. Engel translated the works of Nikolai Lobachevski from Russian into German, thus making these works more accessible. With Paul Stäckel he wrote a history of non-Euclidean geometry (Theorie der Parallellinien von Euklid bis auf Gauss, 1895). With his former student Karl Faber, he wrote a book on the theory of partial differential equations of the first order using methods of Lie group theory. In 1910 Engel was the president of the Deutsche Mathematiker-Vereinigung.

See also 
 Engel group
 Engel expansion
 Engel's theorem

References

External links 
 
 
 
 
 

1861 births
1941 deaths
People from the Kingdom of Saxony
Humboldt University of Berlin alumni
Leipzig University alumni
Academic staff of Leipzig University
Academic staff of the University of Greifswald
Academic staff of the University of Giessen
19th-century German mathematicians
20th-century German mathematicians
German historians of mathematics